Slough Creek is a stream in Morris County, Kansas, in the United States. It flows to Council Grove Lake.

The name is descriptive for the creek's "sloughy" appearance.

See also
List of rivers of Kansas

References

Rivers of Morris County, Kansas
Rivers of Kansas